Walter Mößinger (born 1 March 1949) is a retired German artistic gymnast. He competed at the 1972 Summer Olympics and 1974 World Artistic Gymnastics Championships and placed fifth with West German teams on both occasions.

References

1949 births
Living people
Gymnasts at the 1972 Summer Olympics
Olympic gymnasts of West Germany
German male artistic gymnasts